Rocco Pagliarulo (born 21 November 1994, Salerno), professionally known as Rocco Hunt, is an Italian rapper and singer.

Career 
In 2014 he participated in and won the Sanremo Music Festival (winner of the "Nuove Proposte" class).

Discography

Albums

Mixtapes

Extended play

Singles

Featured in

Other songs

References

External links
 

1994 births
Living people
Italian rappers
People from Salerno
Sanremo Music Festival winners of the newcomers section